KSMD may refer to:

 KSMD (AM), a radio station (1300 AM) licensed to serve Searcy, Arkansas, United States
 KRZS (FM), a radio station (99.1 FM) licensed to serve Pangburn, Arkansas
 Smith Field (Indiana) (ICAO code KSMD)